Luiz Gustavo Silva de Aviz (born 23 February 1972), commonly known as Luiz Gustavo is a former Brazilian footballer who played as a forward.

Club career
Born in Belo Horizonte, Gustavo is a youth product of Cruzeiro Esporte Clube, where he spent one year, alongside Ramon.

In 1991, at age 19, Gustavo moved to Portugal to play for C.F. Os Belenenses, at the time competing in the second tier. He scored nine goals in 23 games, helping the Lisbon-side promote to the Primeira Divisão. In the next three years, Gustavo was a regular starter at Belenenses, with his best season being in 1994-95 with 4 goals.

In 1995, he moved to S.L. Benfica, debuting on 9 September 1995, in a home draw with S.C. Salgueiros. With only two starts in 14 appearances during the 1995–96 season, he moved to Internacional to regain more playing time. He then represented nearly ten other clubs, the larger being Fluminense FC, retiring in 2007 at age 35.

International career
He represented Brazil U20 in the 1989 FIFA U20, which ended in a semi-finals loss against Portugal U20.

References

External links

1972 births
Living people
Footballers from Belo Horizonte
Brazilian footballers
Cruzeiro Esporte Clube players
C.F. Os Belenenses players
S.L. Benfica footballers
Sport Club Internacional players
Esporte Clube Vitória players
Grêmio Esportivo Brasil players
Mogi Mirim Esporte Clube players
União Agrícola Barbarense Futebol Clube players
Fluminense FC players
Esporte Clube São José players
Joinville Esporte Clube players
Esporte Clube Novo Hamburgo players
Clube do Remo players
Primeira Liga players
Liga Portugal 2 players
Campeonato Brasileiro Série A players
Campeonato Brasileiro Série B players
Brazilian expatriate footballers
Expatriate footballers in Portugal
Brazilian expatriate sportspeople in Portugal
Association football forwards